The Islamic Cultural Association (Hong Kong) (ICA) is an Islamic organisation in Hong Kong. It was formed in 2004 and became a government-approved charitable institution.

Functions

Objectives
 Promote Islamic culture with Quran and Sunnah as its core
 Promote exchanges between Islamic culture and other cultures
 Enhance research and development of Islamic education and Islamic culture

Scope of work
ICA's major scope of work includes academic research, education, culture and charity. Since 2009, the ICA has participated the Hong Kong Book Fair organised by the Hong Kong Trade Development Council, one of Asia's largest book fair.

Events
In 2009, they co-organised the International Conference on Transmission of Islamic Culture and Education in China 「中國伊斯蘭文化與教育的傳承」國際研討會 in co-operation with the centre for the Study of Religion and Chinese Society of the Chinese University of Hong Kong's Chung Chi College.

See also
 Islam in China
 Islam in Hong Kong

References

External links
 

2004 establishments in Hong Kong
Islamic organisations based in Hong Kong
Islamic organizations established in 2004